Natarsia is a genus of non-biting midges in the subfamily Tanypodinae of the bloodworm family Chironomidae.

Species
N. baltimoreus (Macquart, 1855)
N. fastuosa (Johannsen, 1905)
N. miripes (Coquillett, 1905)
N. nugax (Walker, 1856)
N. punctata (Fabricius, 1805)
N. qinlingica (Cheng & Wang, 2006)

References

Tanypodinae
Diptera of Europe